The 2017 Bauer Watertechnology Cup was a professional tennis tournament played on carpet courts. It was the 21st edition of the tournament which was part of the 2017 ATP Challenger Tour. It took place in Eckental, Germany between 30 October and 5 November 2017.

Singles main-draw entrants

Seeds

 1 Rankings are as of 23 October 2017.

Other entrants
The following players received wildcards into the singles main draw:
  Daniel Altmaier
  Jeremy Jahn
  Daniel Masur
  Rudolf Molleker

The following player received entry into the singles main draw using a protected ranking:
  Igor Sijsling

The following player received entry into the singles main draw as a special exempt:
  Corentin Moutet

The following players received entry from the qualifying draw:
  Mathias Bourgue
  Kenny de Schepper
  Evan Furness
  Robin Kern

The following player received entry as a lucky loser:
  Yann Marti

Champions

Singles

 Maximilian Marterer def.  Jerzy Janowicz 7–6(10–8), 3–6, 6–3.

Doubles

 Sander Arends /  Roman Jebavý def.  Ken Skupski /  Neal Skupski 6–2, 6–4.

External links
Official Website

2017 ATP Challenger Tour
2017
2017 in German tennis